The Port of Texas City is a major deepwater port in Texas City, Texas at Galveston Bay, United States. Its location on the bay, which is used by the Port of Houston and the Port of Galveston, puts Texas City in the heart of one of the world's most important shipping hubs.  the Port of Texas City was the 14th leading port in the United States by total tons of trade and as of 2007 it was the 87th leading port in the world, according to the American Association of Port Authorities.

Traffic volume
In 2008, the total trade at the port was  making Texas City the third leading port in Texas and the 14th leading port in the United States.  it was also the 87th leading port in the world. In 2005, the total value of foreign trade shipped through the port was US$ (22nd in the U.S.). Of that the value of foreign imports was US$ (22nd in the U.S.) and the value of foreign exports was US$ (25th in the U.S.).

Texas City Disaster

In 1947, an explosion aboard the French-flagged S.S. Grandcamp, docked at Texas City, triggered fires and explosions throughout the port and the industrial complex. The resulting destruction is considered by many to be the worst industrial tragedy in the history of the United States. The fires caused more than five hundred deaths, more than four thousand injuries, and more than US$50 million in damage (US$ million in today's dollars). In spite of the destruction the city was able to rebuild quickly and the port soon re-opened.

See also

 Port of Galveston
 Port of Houston
 Texas City Terminal Railway
 List of ports in the United States
 Gulf Intracoastal Waterway

Notes

Galveston Bay Area
Greater Houston
Texas City
Texas City, Texas
Transportation in Galveston County, Texas
Buildings and structures in Galveston County, Texas
1893 establishments in Texas